Nicotiana obtusifolia, or desert tobacco, is a plant native to the southwestern United States (from California to Utah to Texas) and Mexico.

References

External links
Calflora Database: Nicotiana obtusifolia (desert tobacco) 
Jepson eFlora treatment of Nicotiana obtusifolia
Nicotiana obtusifolia — CalPhotos archive gallery

obtusifolia
North American desert flora
Flora of the Southwestern United States
Flora of California
Flora of Baja California
Flora of Hidalgo (state)
Flora of New Mexico
Flora of Puebla
Flora of Sonora
Flora of Texas
Flora of the California desert regions
Flora of the Chihuahuan Desert
Flora of the Great Basin
Flora of the Sonoran Deserts
Natural history of the Colorado Desert
Natural history of the Mojave Desert
Flora without expected TNC conservation status